is a velodrome located in Utsunomiya, Tochigi that conducts pari-mutuel Keirin racing - one of Japan's four authorized  where gambling is permitted. Nicknamed , its Keirin identification number for betting purposes is 24# (24 sharp).

Utsunomiya's oval is 500 meters in circumference. A typical keirin race of 2,025 meters consists of four laps around the course.

Utsunomiya Velodrome is the home track of Yūichirō Kamiyama, a 21-year Keirin veteran and one of the sport's best competitors with 16 GI (Grade 1) victories in his career.

External links
Utsunomiya Keirin Home Page (Japanese)
keirin.jp Utsunomiya Information (Japanese)

Velodromes in Japan
Utsunomiya
Sports venues in Tochigi Prefecture
Sports venues completed in 2009
2009 establishments in Japan